Four regiments of the British Army have been numbered the 91st Regiment of Foot:

91st Regiment of Foot (1759), raised in 1759
91st Regiment of Foot (Shropshire Volunteers), raised in 1779
91st Regiment of Foot, raised in 1793
91st (Argyllshire Highlanders) Regiment of Foot, raised in 1794 as the 98th and renumbered in 1796 as the 91st